Anderson Heights form a roughly rectangular snow-covered tableland,  long and  wide, with an elevation somewhat over , located between Mount Bennett and Mount Butters in the east part of the Bush Mountains of Antarctica. It was discovered and photographed by U.S. Navy Operation Highjump (1946–47) on the flights of February 16, 1947, and named by the Advisory Committee on Antarctic Names for Lieutenant George H. Anderson, a U.S. Navy pilot of Flight 8 of that date from Little America to the South Pole and return.

References 

Plateaus of Antarctica
Landforms of the Ross Dependency
Dufek Coast